Elias Tukia (29 September 1877 – 30 April 1950) was a Finnish farmer and politician. He was born in Lappee. He was a Member of the Parliament of Finland, representing the Finnish Party from 1916 to 1918, the National Coalition Party from 1918 to 1919 and the Agrarian League from 1924 to 1948.

References

1877 births
1950 deaths
People from Lappeenranta
People from Viipuri Province (Grand Duchy of Finland)
Finnish Party politicians
National Coalition Party politicians
Centre Party (Finland) politicians
Members of the Parliament of Finland (1916–17)
Members of the Parliament of Finland (1917–19)
Members of the Parliament of Finland (1924–27)
Members of the Parliament of Finland (1927–29)
Members of the Parliament of Finland (1929–30)
Members of the Parliament of Finland (1930–33)
Members of the Parliament of Finland (1933–36)
Members of the Parliament of Finland (1936–39)
Members of the Parliament of Finland (1939–45)
Members of the Parliament of Finland (1945–48)
People of the Finnish Civil War (White side)
Finnish people of World War II